The Higuito River is a river in Honduras.

See also
List of rivers of Honduras

References
Rand McNally, The New International Atlas, 1993.
CIA map: :Image:Honduras rel 1985.jpg
UN map: :Image:Un-honduras.png
Google Maps

Rivers of Honduras